Foster Gilmore Calder (February 11, 1873 – January 12, 1960) was a Canadian politician. He served in the Legislative Assembly of New Brunswick as member of the Liberal party from 1935 to 1944.

References

1873 births
1960 deaths
20th-century Canadian legislators
Progressive Conservative Party of New Brunswick MLAs